Thaikkupin Tharam is a 1956 Indian Tamil-language film, the directorial debut of M. A. Thirumugam. The film stars M. G. Ramachandran and P. Bhanumathi. It was the first film produced by Sandow M. M. A. Chinnappa Thevar under the then newly-formed Thevar Films. Thaikkupin Tharam was released on 21 September 1956 and ran for over 100 days in theatres.

Plot 
Muthaiyan is the brave son of Ratnam Pillai and Meenakshi. They are landed gentry and are highly respected in the village for their noble qualities. Meenakshi's brother Doraiswami, on the other hand, is disliked by all for his arrogance, cruelty and dishonourable ways. The two families are not in speaking terms ever since Doraiswami tried to usurp Ratnam Pillai's traditional rights at the temple festival. Doraiswami's daughter, Sivakami, however, is a good-natured girl who is in love with Muthaiyan. Muthaiyan too reciprocates her love and they are determined to surmount all hurdles and get married. When Doraiswami's men capture Muthaiyan and keep him a prisoner on the pretext that he had hurled stones at Doraiswami's prized bull when he had caught it grazing on his crops, Sivakami comes to his rescue.

Meanwhile, accosting Doraiswami demanding his son's release, Ratnam Pillai declares bravely that he would overpower the touted bull. But the bull gores him to death. In his dying breath, he elicits a promise from Meenakshi that she would ensure that their son sets right this slur on their honour. Muthaiyan's mother makes him promise that he would not even think of Sivakami any more. Sivakami's father too has isolated her in house arrest and has started looking out for a suitable husband for her.

At a bullock cart race for Sivakami's hand, Doraiswami sabotages Muthaiyan's cart, and although he is first, he injures  right after crossing the finish line. Doraiswami tells off Sivakami for her support of Muthaiyan and Meenakshi, while tending to Muthaiyan's injuries, tells him to not talk to Sivakami. The two meet each other that night anyway but are seen by a servant of Doraiswami, as well as Meenakshi.

How Muthaiyan wins the hand of Sivakami after overpowering the mighty bull Senkodan and reforming his wily uncle forms rest of the tale.

Cast 

Male cast
 M. G. Ramachandran as Muthaiyan
 T. S. Balaiah as Duraisami Pannaiyar
 E. R. Sahadevan as Rathnam Pillai
 Kaka Radhakrishnan as Velan
 Sandow M. M. A. Chinnappa (Thevar) as Mayandi

Female cast
 P. Bhanumathi as Sivakami
 P. Kannamba as Meenakshi
 Surabhi. Balasaraswathi as Selva
 G. Sakunthala as Valli
 K. Rathnam as Senkamalam
 K. R. Saradambal as Patti

Dance
 Sayee–Subbulakshmi

Production 
Thaikkupin Tharam was the directorial debut of M. A. Thirumugam, and the first film produced by Sandow M. M. A. Chinnappa Thevar under the then newly-formed Thevar Films. Principal photography commenced on 5 July 1955 in the sets put up at Vauhini Studios, with Nagi Reddi cranking the camera for the first shot. Thirumugam also took care of editing, assisted by M. A. Mariappan and M. G. Balu Rao.

Soundtrack 
The music was composed by K. V. Mahadevan. Lyrics were by Thanjai N. Ramaiah Dass, A. Maruthakasi, Kavi Lakshmanadas, T. A. Natarajan and Sandow M. M. A. Chinnappa Thevar.

Release and reception 
Thaikkupin Tharam was released on 21 September 1956, delayed from a 14 September release. The Indian Express wrote the film is "a picture distinctive for theme and treatment alike. Neither a social nor a conventional thriller, yet ambitious to combine the powers of both, it is a fantasia". According to historian Sachi Sri Kantha, it was the "first successful movie in a social theme" for Ramachandran. The film ran for over 100 days in theatres.

References

External links 
 

1950s Tamil-language films
1956 directorial debut films
1956 films
Films directed by M. A. Thirumugam
Films scored by K. V. Mahadevan